The 1996 USISL Select League season was the first season of a professional men's soccer league which featured teams from the United States. The league shared Division II status in the American soccer pyramid with the A-League, before the two leagues merged in 1997 as the USISL A-League.

History
The league had its origins in the United States Interregional Soccer League (USISL), which was the de facto second tier of American soccer during the early 1990s, and until 1995 confined itself to organising regional leagues.

The USISL Pro League, which had been at the third tier of the pyramid in 1995, split into two leagues in 1996; the best teams joined the new USISL Select League, while the remainder (plus expansion teams) remained in the USISL Pro League, which retained its Division III status. Both the A-League and the new USISL Select League had Division II status in 1996.

In an attempt to counteract the fact that a number of top A-League players had left to join MLS in 1995 and 1996 six of the seven remaining A-League teams – Montreal Impact, Colorado Foxes,  Seattle Sounders, Rochester Raging Rhinos, Vancouver 86ers and Atlanta Ruckus, plus two planned A-League expansion teams (Toronto Lynx and Hershey Wildcats) merged with the USISL Select League to form a consolidated Division II league before the 1997 season. The resulting merged league retained the A-League name, and the USISL Select League name was abandoned.

USISL Select League teams

 California Jaguars
 Cape Cod Crusaders (now in PDL)
 Carolina Dynamo (joined A-League in 1997; now in PDL)
 Chicago Stingers
 Connecticut Wolves (joined A-League in 1997)
 Delaware Wizards
 El Paso Patriots (now in PDL)
 Hampton Roads Mariners
 Long Island Rough Riders (joined A-League in 1997; now in PDL)
 Milwaukee Rampage (joined A-League in 1997)
 Minnesota Thunder (joined A-League in 1997)

 New Mexico Chiles
 New Orleans Riverboat Gamblers (joined A-League in 1997)
 New York/New Jersey Stallions
 Ohio Xoggz
 Raleigh Flyers (joined A-League in 1997)
 Reno Rattlers
 Richmond Kickers (joined A-League in 1997; now in USL Pro)
 Sacramento Scorpions
 South Carolina Shamrocks
 Tampa Bay Cyclones (became Jacksonville Cylones and joined A-League in 1997)

Champions
Regular Season: Carolina Dynamo (43 points, 14–3–1 record)
Playoff Winners: California Jaguars (beat Richmond Kickers 2–1)

Regular season
 Regulation win = 3 points
 Shootout win (SW) = 1 point
 Loss (regulation or shootout) = 0 points

Eastern Conference

North Atlantic Division

South Atlantic Division

Western Conference

Central Division

Pacific Division

Playoffs

First round

Second round

Minnesota Thunder vs Milwaukee Rampage

Hampton Roads Mariners vs Carolina Dynamos

California Jaguars vs Sacramento Scorpions

Long Island Rough Riders vs Delaware Wizards

 The game was suspended in the 39th minute due to lightning.  Play resumed on August 24, 1996, at 2:00 PM.

Select Six Tournament
The Select Six Tournament consisted of six teams.  The Richmond Kickers participated as hosts.  The Charleston Battery entered as the champion of the 1996 USISL Professional League.  The other four teams came from the winners of the second round playoff games.

Group A

Group B

Semifinals

California Jaguars vs Minnesota Thunder

Richmond Kickers vs Long Island Rough Riders

Final

Points leaders

Honors
 MVP: Dan Stebbins
 Points leader: Dan Stebbins
 Defender of the Year: Ezra Hendrickson
 Goalkeeper of the Year: Scott Garlick
 Rookie of the Year: Luis Marillo
 Coach of the Year: Alan Dicks
 Organization of the Year: Minnesota Thunder
 All-League
Goalkeeper: Carmine Isacco
Defenders: Ezra Hendrickson, Derick Crownell, Stuart Fitzsimmons
Midfielders: Amos Magee, Travis Rinker, Oswaldo Ortiz, Yari Allnutt
Forwards: Dan Stebbins, John Jones, Paul Young

External links
United Soccer Leagues (RSSSF)

References

A-League (1995–2004) seasons
2